Terry Thomas (Terence James Thomas) is an English singer-songwriter and guitarist, best known as the founding member, lead singer and lead guitarist of the English rock band Charlie.

Biography
Thomas founded Charlie in 1971 and remained the only constant member, although his role as lead singer was taken instead by Terry Slesser for the band's 1983 album Charlie. The 2009 album Kitchens of Distinction, the first recording credited to Charlie in over twenty years, was largely a Thomas solo album, but was credited to Charlie due to contributions by former members Julian Colbeck and Martin Smith.

Thomas has also worked with other high-profile acts, most notably Bad Company, with whom he produced three albums in the late 1980s and early 1990s, after lead singer Paul Rodgers had been replaced by Brian Howe. Thomas also co-wrote many of the songs for the three albums, Dangerous Age, Holy Water and Here Comes Trouble. He also co-produced and co-wrote many of the song's on Foreigner's album Unusual Heat and also co-wrote and produced Tommy Shaw's album Ambition, and Tesla's 1994 album Bust A Nut.

He continues to write and to perform live, now under the name of his new musical project, The Fabulous Lampshades.

External links
Charlie – Terry Thomas interview – classicrockmusicblog.com

Year of birth missing (living people)
Living people
English male singer-songwriters
English rock guitarists
English male guitarists
Charlie (band) members